Jamaica competed at the 1980 Summer Paralympics in Arnhem, Netherlands. 13 competitors from Jamaica won 19 medals including 7 gold, 7 silver and 5 bronze, and finished 18th in the medal table.

See also 
 Jamaica at the Paralympics
 Jamaica at the 1980 Summer Olympics

References 

Jamaica at the Paralympics
Nations at the 1980 Summer Paralympics